Reinier Paping (18 February 1931 – 20 December 2021) was a Dutch speedskater primarily known as the winner of the Elfstedentocht of 1963. This Elfstedentocht became known as "The hell of '63" when only 69 of the 9,292 contestants were able to finish the race, due to the extremely low temperatures, dipping to −18°C, and a harsh eastern wind. After winning the race, he was recognized as a national hero in the Netherlands.

Early life and career
Paping was born in Dedemsvaart on 18 February, 1931. Before 1963, Paping had participated in several Dutch allround championships, with a 4th place in 1955 as his best result.

The 1963 Elfstedentocht
Not even halfway through the harsh Elfstedentocht of 18 January 1963, Paping skated away from a leading group with Jeen van den Berg, Anton Verhoeven, and Jan Uitham, and travelled the rest of the trip alone. Paping finished the race in ten hours and 59 minutes, while the second-place finisher, Jan Uitham, arrived a full 22 minutes later. Because of the horrendous conditions—which included bone-chilling cold of −18 °C—his long solo escape, and the fact that the next Elfstedentocht was not held until 22 years later, Paping became a national hero and the tour itself legendary.

Death
Paping died on 20 December 2021, at age 90.

References

1931 births
2021 deaths
Dutch male speed skaters
People from Avereest
Sportspeople from Overijssel